Christopher Hall Island is an uninhabited island off the coast of Baffin Island in the Arctic Archipelago in Nunavut's Qikiqtaaluk Region. The island lies in the Labrador Sea between Popham Bay and Neptune Bay, off the east coast of Hall Peninsula's Finger Land. The Leybourne Islands are to the south, while Jackson Island is to the north.

Islands of Baffin Island
Uninhabited islands of Qikiqtaaluk Region
Islands of the Labrador Sea